Geraldo Martins  is a Bissau-Guinean economist and politician. He was Minister of Economy and Finance in the government of Prime Minister Domingos Simões Pereira in 2014.

Education 
Geraldo Martins was degree in Law. He earned a master's degree in Public Policy and Management from the University of London.

Government posts 
 Minister of National Education, Science and Technology
 Minister of Economy and Finance

References 

Living people
Bissau-Guinean economists
Government ministers of Guinea-Bissau
Finance ministers of Guinea-Bissau
Education ministers
Science ministers
African Party for the Independence of Guinea and Cape Verde politicians
Alumni of the University of London
Year of birth missing (living people)